is a girls' private secondary school in Tama-ku, Kawasaki, Kanagawa Prefecture, Japan.

Roman Catholic nuns from Quebec established the school in 1961.

See also
 List of junior high schools in Kanagawa Prefecture

References

External links
 Caritas Girls' Junior & Senior High School 
 

Kawasaki, Kanagawa
High schools in Kanagawa Prefecture
Girls' schools in Japan
1961 establishments in Japan
Educational institutions established in 1961